Just transition is a framework developed by the trade union movement to encompass a range of social interventions needed to secure workers' rights and livelihoods when economies are shifting to sustainable production, primarily combating climate change and protecting biodiversity. In Europe, advocates for a just transition want to unite social and climate justice, for example, for coal workers in coal-dependent developing regions who lack employment opportunities beyond coal.

Definition
In the past years, a number of organizations have deployed the concept of a Just Transition with respect to environmental and/or climate justice.

In policy

International policy 
At the 2015 United Nations Climate Change Conference in Paris, France, or COP 21, unions and just transition advocates convinced the Parties to include language regarding just transition and the creation of decent work in the Paris Agreement’s preamble.

At the 2018 United Nations Climate Change Conference in Katowice, Poland, or COP 24, the Heads of State and Government adopted the Solidarity and Just Transition Silesia Declaration, highlighting the importance of just transition as mentioned in the Paris Agreement, the ILO's Guidelines, and the United Nations 2030 Agenda for Sustainable Development. The Declaration encourages all relevant United Nations agencies to proceed with its implementation and consider the issue of just transition when drafting and implementing parties' nationally determined contributions, or NDCs.

At COP26, the European Investment Bank announced a set of just transition common principles agreed upon with multilateral development banks, which also align with the Paris Agreement. The principles refer to focusing financing on the transition to net zero carbon economies, while keeping socioeconomic effects in mind, along with policy engagement and plans for inclusion and gender equality, all aiming to deliver long-term economic transformation.

The African Development Bank, Asian Development Bank, Islamic Development Bank, Council of Europe Development Bank, Asian Infrastructure Investment Bank, European Bank for Reconstruction and Development, New Development Bank, and Inter-American Development Bank are among the multilateral development banks that have vowed to uphold the principles of climate change mitigation and a Just Transition. The World Bank Group also contributed.

European Union mechanism 
In the European Union, the concerns facing workers in fossil fuel industries are addressed by the Just Transition mechanism in the European Green Deal.  The funding and mechanism helps fossil fuel-dependent regions within the European Union to transition to a greener economy.

A just transition from coal is supported by the European Bank for Reconstruction and Development.

Climate litigation 
A 2021 review of legal theories for climate litigation and a just transition, recommended using accountability litigation against companies in industries that would lose work.

Publications
 Stevis, Dimitris (2021) Labour Unions and Environmental Justice: The Trajectory and Politics of Just Transition. In Coolsaet, B. (ed) Environmental Justice: Key Issues, London and New York: Earthscan/Routledge
 Bell, Karen (2020), Working-Class Environmentalism: An Agenda for a Just and Fair Transition to Sustainability, London: Palgrave
 Hampton, Paul (2015), Workers and Trade Unions for Climate Solidarity, London and New York: Routledge
 Morena, Edouard, Dunja Krause and Dimitris Stevis (2020), Just Transitions: Social Justice in the Shift Towards a Low-Carbon World, London: Pluto
 Räthzel, Nora and David Uzzell (2013), Trade Unions in the Green Economy: Working for the Environment, London and New York: Earthscan/Routledge
 United Nations Global Compact, International Chamber of Shipping, International Transport Workers' Federation: Mapping a Maritime Just Transition (2022) https://www.ics-shipping.org/wp-content/uploads/2022/11/Position-Paper-Mapping-a-Maritime-Just-Transition-for-Seafarers-%E2%80%93-Maritime-Just-Transition-Task-Force-2022-OFFICIAL.pdf

References

External links
 EU Just Transition Mechanism
 European Bank for Reconstruction and Development
 Green jobs, safe jobs, Hazards magazine

Climate justice
Low-carbon economy